

External links
Official Website (Montenegrin language)
Internet Radio Stream
Budva

Radio stations in Montenegro